Exonuclease I may refer to one of two enzymes:
Phosphodiesterase I
Exodeoxyribonuclease I